Hustler White is a 1996 film by Bruce LaBruce and Rick Castro, a satirical black sex comedy about gay hustlers and their customers on Santa Monica Boulevard in West Hollywood, California. It stars Tony Ward and LaBruce in an addition to the Queer Cinema canon, which is also an homage to classic Hollywood cinema. Also appearing in the film are Vaginal Davis, Glen Meadmore and Graham David Smith.

In a plot reminiscent of Sunset Boulevard, Hustler White transposes the action from the silver screen's old movie backlots to contemporary male prostitution and the porn industry. The film, which like all of LaBruce's work is sexually explicit, includes a controversial amputee sex scene. Co-director Rick Castro cast real male hustlers and his former models, including Tony Ward, as amateur actors. They also used the hustlers' homes (and other cast members' including Ron Athey's house in Silver Lake Hills) as location spots for filming.

Portions of the film appear in the music video for "Misogyny" a track by Canadian rock band Rusty which appeared on MuchMusic in the 1990s.

Synopsis
The film starts with Monti Ward (Tony Ward), a male prostitute, dead in a jacuzzi. Then in a voice over, Monti describes the circumstances that led to his fate.

Jürgen Anger (Bruce LaBruce), a writer from Europe, is in California researching a book on the gay prostitution and pornographic scene in Hollywood. While touring Santa Monica Boulevard, he meets Monti hustling on the street and develops a crush on him. Throughout the movie we discover various facets of Monti, including committing a hit and run which cripples a fellow hustler named Eigil (Kevin P. Scott). Jürgen unsuccessfully follows the devastatingly handsome rent-boy. As Jürgen continues his pursuit of the young man, the film follows Monti through his typical routine of various sordid and bizarre encounters with hustlers, johns and pornographers.

Finally Jürgen can get Monti to show him various places in the gay prostitution scene of Hollywood. They end up at Jürgen's apartment, where Monti trips on a soap and remains unconscious in the jacuzzi. Jürgen finds him and pulls him out of the water, thinking he is dead. He brings him to the beach to dump his body in the ocean, but Monti wakes up. The two of them end up running hand in hand on the beach.

Cast
 Tony Ward as Montgomery Ward
 Bruce La Bruce as Jürgen Anger
 Alex Austin as Alex
 Kevin Kramer  as Kevin
 Ron Athey as Seymour Kasabian
 Glen Meadmore as Stew Blake
 Ivar Johnson  as Piglet
 Kevin P. Scott as Eigil Vesti
 Graham David Smith as Ambrose Sapperstein
 Miles H. Wildecock II as Peter Festus
 Bud Cockerham as Bud Cockram
 Michael Glass as Mrs Glass
 Vaginal Davis as Buster Boote
 Joaquín Martínez as Ryan Block
 Darryl Carlton as Divinity Fudge
 Tony Powers as himself
 Paul 'Superhustler' Bateman as Billy Ray Jaded
 Barry Morse (credited as Dimitri Xolt) as Roger V. Deem 
 Paul Bellini as Roger's Secretary
 Matt Johnstone as UCLA Student Driver
 Max Millan as Amerikka
 Sean McAndrew  as  Hustler Twin #1
 Ryan McAndrew  as  Hustler Twin #2
 Stephen Mounce as Daddy's Boy Hustler
 Brent Hoover as Hustler
 Merie Morris as Hustler
 Billy Mauro as JFK Jr. Lookalike Hustler
 Rocco Haze as Monti's Baby
 Antonio Lee Klatt as Slave Hanging from Ankles
 Chris Berry as Porno Mexican Wrestling Extra
 Rick Castro as Clumsy Porno Cameraman

References

External links

1996 films
Alt porn
English-language Canadian films
Canadian drama films
Canadian LGBT-related films
Films directed by Bruce LaBruce
Films about male prostitution in the United States
Films about gay male pornography
Films about pornography
LGBT-related black comedy films
1996 drama films
1996 LGBT-related films
Films about amputees
1990s English-language films
1990s Canadian films